The Accademia di Belle Arti di Urbino is an academy of fine arts located in Urbino, Marche. It was founded in 1967.

References

External links
  

Art schools in Italy
Education in Urbino
Educational institutions established in 1967
1967 establishments in Italy
Education in Marche